The 1997–98 Western Professional Hockey League season was the second season of the Western Professional Hockey League, a North American minor pro league. 12 teams participated in the regular season, and the El Passo Buzzards were the league champions. Traktor Chelyabinsk, which was touring from Russia, played in 12 games.

Regular season

President's Cup-Playoffs

External links
 Season 1997/98 on hockeydb.com

Western Professional Hockey League seasons
WPHL